Joe Robinson may refer to:

Joe Robinson (footballer, born 1919) (1919–1991), English football goalkeeper
Joe Robinson (actor) (1927–2017), English actor and stuntman
Joe Sam Robinson (born 1945), American neurosurgeon
Joe Robinson (radio personality) (born 1968), American radio personality
Joe Robinson (musician) (born 1991), Australian guitarist and 2008 winner of Australia's Got Talent
Joe Robinson (footballer, born 1996), English professional footballer

See also
Joseph Robinson (disambiguation)